Benjamin Fafale (born 14 September 1968) is a retired weightlifter who represented the Solomon Islands at the Summer Olympics.

Fafale competed at the 1988 Summer Olympics held in Seoul. There, at the age of 20, he finished 22nd. He was the youngest competitor for the Solomon Islands.

References

External links
 

1968 births
Living people
Solomon Islands male weightlifters
Olympic weightlifters of the Solomon Islands
Weightlifters at the 1988 Summer Olympics